This article details the fixtures and results of the Thailand national football team in 2014.
 Only record the results that affect the FIFA/Coca-Cola World Ranking. See FIFA 'A' matches criteria.

Record

Goalscorers

vs Lebanon
2015 AFC Asian Cup qualification

Assistant referees:
Ochi Shinji (Japan)
Hiro Shi Yamauchi (Japan)
Fourth official:
Kimura Hiroyuki  (Japan)

vs Kuwait
International friendly

Assistant referees:
Sumate Saiwaew (Thailand)
Thapana Tawon  (Thailand)
Fourth official:
Teetichai Nualjan  (Thailand)

vs China
International friendly

vs Philippines
International friendly

Assistant referees:
Pham Manh Long (Vietnam)
Nguyen Trung Hau (Vietnam)
Fourth official:
Teetichai Nualjan  (Thailand)

vs  New Zealand
International friendly

Assistant referees:
Pham Manh Long (Vietnam)
Nguyen Trung Hau (Vietnam)
Fourth official:
Teetichai Nualjan  (Thailand)

vs Singapore
2014 AFF Championship — Group Round

Assistant referees:
 Mohammad Reza Mansouri (Iran)
 Kim Young Ha (South Korea)
Fourth official:
 Ahmed Al-Kaf (Oman)

vs Malaysia
2014 AFF Championship — Group Round

Assistant referees:
 Kim Young Ha (South Korea)
 Mohammad Reza Mansouri (Iran)
Fourth official:
 Alireza Faghani (Iran)

vs Myanmar
2014 AFF Championship — Group Round

Assistant referees:
Ruslan Serazitdinov (Uzbekistan)
Mohammad Reza Mansouri (Iran)
Fourth official:
Viktor Serazitdinov (Uzbekistan)

vs Philippines(1)
2014 AFF Championship — Semifinal First Leg

Assistant referees:
 Juma Al Burshaid (Qatar)
 Saoud Ahmed Al Maqaleh (Qatar)
Fourth official:
 Abdulrahman Al Jassim (Qatar)

vs Philippines(2)
2014 AFF Championship — Semifinal Second Leg

Assistant referees:
Lee Jung-Min (South Korea)
Choi Min-Byung (South Korea)
Fourth official:
Kim Dae-yon  (South Korea)

vs Malaysia(1)
2014 AFF Championship — Final First Leg

Assistant referees:
Saidov Jakhongir  (Uzbekistan)
Chow Chun Kit (Hong Kong)
Fourth official:
Aziz Asimov  (Uzbekistan)

vs Malaysia(2)
2014 AFF Championship — Final Second Leg

Assistant referees:
 Sokhandan Reza Ebrahim (Iran)
 Mohammad Reza Abolfazli (Iran)
Fourth official:
 Yu Ming-hsun (Chinese Taipei)

References
Fixtures and Results on FIFA.com
Thailand Matches on Elo Ratings

2014 in Thai football
2014 national football team results
Thailand national football team results